Arun Kumar (born 1961) is a Fijian international male lawn bowler.

Biography

Commonwealth Games
Kumar has represented Fiji at both the 2014 Commonwealth Games and the 2018 Commonwealth Games.

World Championships
Kumar has competed in three World Championships Championships and in 2020 he was selected for his fourth, at the 2020 World Outdoor Bowls Championship in Australia.

Asia Pacific Championships
Kumar won a pairs bronze medal with Ratish Lal at the 2007 Asia Pacific Bowls Championships in New Zealand and another bronze with David Aitcheson and Waisea Turaga at the 2015 Asia Pacific Bowls Championships in New Zealand.

References

Living people
1961 births
Fijian male bowls players
Bowls players at the 2014 Commonwealth Games
Bowls players at the 2018 Commonwealth Games
Commonwealth Games competitors for Fiji